National Highway 141 is a national highway of India.

References

National highways in India
Transport in Gandhidham
Transport in Kutch district